Neocalyptis tricensa is a moth of the family Tortricidae. It is found in Vietnam, India and Taiwan.

References

Moths described in 1912
Neocalyptis